Lac de Longemer is a lake near Xonrupt-Longemer, in Vosges, France.

Longemer
Longemer
LLongemer